Jean-Daniel Masserey (born 27 February 1972)  is a Swiss ski mountaineer.

Selected results 
 1998:
 1st, Patrouille de la Maya A-course, together with Gabriel Besson and Jean-Yves Rey
 1999:
 7th, Pierra Menta (together with Jean-Yves Rey)
 2000:
 1st, Patrouille de la Maya A-course, together with Pierre-Marie Taramarcaz and Jean-Yves Rey
 2003:
 6th, European Championship team race (together with Jean-Yves Rey)
 2004:
 1st, Patrouille de la Maya A-course, together with Sébastien Epiney and Jean-Yves Rey
 2nd, Trophée des Gastlosen, together with Jean-Yves Rey
 2005:
 7th, European Championship team race (together with Jean-Yves Rey)
 2004:
 1st, Patrouille de la Maya A-course, together with Pierre-Marie Taramarcaz and Jean-Yves Rey

Patrouille des Glaciers 

 1998: 3rd (international military teams ranking), together with Jean-Yves Rey and Gabriel Besson
 2000: 2nd (and 1st in "seniors I" class ranking), together with Jean-Yves Rey and Pierre-Marie Taramarcaz
 2004: 2nd, together with Pierre-Marie Taramarcaz and Jean-Yves Rey
 2008: 2nd, together with Pierre-Marie Taramarcaz and Jean-Yves Rey
 2010: 3rd, together with Rico Elmer and Jean-Yves Rey

References 

1972 births
Living people
Swiss male ski mountaineers
Swiss military patrol (sport) runners